Carl Norman Ethelbert Schaefer (16 February 1894 – 17 December 1936) was an Australian rules footballer who played with St Kilda in the Victorian Football League (VFL).

He was born and played football as Carl Schaefer but later in his life chose to be known as Clive Howard, possibly due anti-German sentiment following World War I. He died in December 1936.

Notes

External links 

1894 births
Australian rules footballers from Victoria (Australia)
St Kilda Football Club players
1936 deaths